Sollers is a surname. Notable people with the surname include:

 Philippe Sollers (born 1936), French writer and critic
 Augustus Rhodes Sollers (1814–1862), American politician

See also
 Sollers JSC, a Russian automotive company